Matt Meredith (born July 27, 1984) is an American politician who served in the Oklahoma House of Representatives from the 4th district from 2016 to 2020.

References

1984 births
Living people
Democratic Party members of the Oklahoma House of Representatives
21st-century American politicians